The Eparchy of Bihać and Petrovac is an eparchy (diocese) of the Serbian Orthodox Church with its seat in Bosanski Petrovac, in Bosnia and Herzegovina. It has jurisdiction over the western regions of Bosnia and Herzegovina. Since 2017, Bishop of Bihać and Petrovac is Sergije Karanović.

History
Until 1900, territory of this eparchy for centuries belonged to the Eastern Orthodox Eparchy of Dabar and Bosnia. Upon the request of the Eastern Orthodox Serbs from its western regions, new Eparchy of Banja Luka was created in that year, with seat in the city of Banja Luka. Regions of Bihać and Bosanski Petrovac also belonged to that newly formed eparchy. In 1918, all Serbian Orthodox bishops in Bosnia and Herzegovina reached a unanimous decision to join with other Serbian ecclesiastical provinces into united Serbian Orthodox Church. Arrangements with the Ecumenical Patriarchate of Constantinople were made, and the canonical process of unification was completed in 1920.

Regions of Bihać and Bosanski Petrovac belonged to the Eparchy of Banja Luka until 1925 when new Eparchy of Bihać was formed. Its first bishop was Venjamin Taušanović. In 1931, when Serbian Orthodox Church adopted its Ecclesiastical Constitution, process of reorganization of eparchies was initiated and their number was reduced. One of the abolished eparchies was the short lived Eparchy of Bihać and its territory was returned to Eparchy of Banja Luka. In 1990, upon the requests of the Eastern Orthodox Serbs from the region, eparchy was restored by the Holy Assembly of the Serbian Orthodox Church, under the new name: Eparchy of Bihać and Petrovac, with seat in Bosanski Petrovac. First Bishop of the renewed eparchy was Hrizostom Jević, from 1991 to 2013, when he was transferred to the Eparchy of Zvornik and Tuzla. In the same year, Atanasije Rakita was elected new Bishop of Bihać and Petrovac and enthroned on 11 August (2013) in Petrovac by Serbian Patriarch Irinej. In 2017, he was transferred to the Eparchy of Mileševa, and Sergije Karanović was elected new bishop of Bihać and Petrovac.

Heads
 Venjamin Taušanović (1925–1929)
 Hrizostom Jević (1991–2013)
 Atanasije Rakita (2013–2017)
 Sergije Karanović (2017–present)

Monasteries
 Rmanj Monastery
 Glogovac Monastery
 Veselinje Monastery
 Klisina Monastery
 Treskavac Monastery

See also
Eastern Orthodoxy in Bosnia and Herzegovina
Serbs of Bosnia and Herzegovina
List of the Eparchies of the Serbian Orthodox Church

References

Bibliography

External links
 Official pages of the Eparchy of Bihać and Petrovac
 Official pages of the Serbian Orthodox Church
 SOC: Enthronement of Bishop Atanasije of Bihać and Petrovac
 OCP: Enthronement of Bishop Atanasije of Bihać-Petrovac
 Desecrated Orthodox church in the Kolunic settlement near Bosanski Petrovac

Religious sees of the Serbian Orthodox Church
Serbian Orthodox Church in Bosnia and Herzegovina
Religion in Republika Srpska
Dioceses established in the 20th century